A timeline of the Imperial College School of Medicine, the medical school of Imperial College London.

Westminster Hospital and medical school
1719 – The Westminster Infirmary opens
1760 – The Westminster Infirmary renamed The Westminster Hospital
1834 – The Westminster Hospital moves to new premises in Broad Sanctuary
1841 – Westminster Hospital Medical School founded by George Guthrie
1907 – Westminster Children's Hospital founded as The Infants' Hospital in Vincent Square
1939 – New hospital building opened in Horseferry Road, Westminster
1947 – Westminster Children's Hospital amalgamates with The Westminster Hospital
1950 – Westminster Hospital building in Broad Sanctuary demolished
1995 – The Westminster Hospital moves to Fulham and becomes known as the Chelsea and Westminster Hospital. Old building converted to flats.

Charing Cross Hospital and medical school
1818 – Dr Benjamin Golding founds West London Infirmary in Villiers Street along with the Charing Cross Hospital Medical School
1827 – West London Infirmary becomes known as Charing Cross Hospital
1834 – Charing Cross Hospital moves to Agar Street, off Trafalgar Square
1973 – Charing Cross Hospital moves to Hammersmith, front facade of old building retained
1976 – Reynolds Building completed to house the Charing Cross Hospital Medical School
1984 – Charing Cross Hospital Medical School and rival Westminster Hospital Medical School merge to form Charing Cross and Westminster Medical School

St Mary's Hospital and medical school
1747 – The London Lock Hospital is founded
1830 – Western General Dispensary is founded
1854 – St Mary's Hospital, London and medical school founded in Paddington
1928 – Alexander Fleming discovers penicillin
1929 – The Paddington Infirmary is renamed the Paddington Hospital
1930 – Marylebone Workhouse Infirmary is renamed St Charles' Hospital
1948 – The National Health Service is founded and the Paddington Green Children's Hospital, the Princess Louise Hospital, the Samaritan Hospital for Women, St Luke's Hospital, Bayswater (formerly St Luke's Hospital for the Dying) and the Western Eye Hospital join St Mary's to offer more beds in order to meet the recommendations of the 1944 Goodenough Committee

Hammersmith Hospital and RPMS
1739 – Queen Charlotte's and Chelsea Hospital opens
1902 – Hammersmith Hospital founded
1935 – British Postgraduate Medical School opens
1947 – British Postgraduate Medical School becomes part of the British Postgraduate Medical Foundation and becomes known as the Postgraduate Medical School of London
1974 – Postgraduate Medical School of London renamed Royal Postgraduate Medical School by royal charter
1988 – Royal Postgraduate Medical School merges with the Institute of Obstetrics and Gynaecology

Imperial College
1907 – Imperial College London founded
1988 – St Mary's Hospital Medical School merges with Imperial College London
1997 – Charing Cross and Westminster Medical School, St Mary's Hospital Medical School, and Royal Postgraduate Medical School merge with Imperial College London to form Imperial College School of Medicine
2007 – St Mary's Hospital, London merges with The Hammersmith Hospitals NHS Trust and Imperial College London to form Imperial College Healthcare NHS Trust, the first academic health science centre

History of Imperial College London
Imperial College School of Medicine